Crettaz is a surname. Notable people with the surname include:

Bernard Crettaz (1938–2022), Swiss sociologist and ethnologist
Gonzalo Crettaz (born 2000), Argentine footballer
Véronique Crettaz (1954–2011), French murder victim